The Talgua River or Río Talgua is a river in the Catacamas of Honduras.

Rivers of Honduras